Bolshiye Alabukhi is a rural locality (a selo) and the administrative center of Bolshealabukhskoye Rural Settlement, Gribanovsky District, Voronezh Oblast, Russia. The population was 626 as of 2010. There are 17 streets.

Geography 
Bolshiye Alabukhi is located 28 km northeast of Gribanovsky (the district's administrative centre) by road. Vlasovka is the nearest rural locality.

References 

Rural localities in Gribanovsky District